The 1999 Supercupa României was the 4th edition of Romania's season opener cup competition. The match was played in Bucharest at Stadionul Naţional on 7 October 1999, and was contested between Divizia A title holders, Rapid and Cupa României champions, Steaua. Rapid won the trophy.

Match

Details

External links
Romania - List of Super Cup Finals, RSSSF.com

Super
1999
1999
FC Steaua București matches